Aliabad-e Hasan (also Romanized as ‘Alīābād-e Ḩasan; also known as ‘Alīābād and ‘Alīābād-e Āqā Ḩasan) is a village in Hoseynabad Rural District, in the Central District of Anar County, Kerman Province, Iran. Its population was 341 (2006) persons in 78 families.

References 

Populated places in Anar County